Moutiny is a telecommunications company providing mobile telephony and wireless internet services in Iraq.

See also
 Zain Iraq    
 AsiaCell
 Iraqna
 Korek
 Telephone numbers in Iraq

External links
 https://web.archive.org/web/20090327114631/http://www.moutiny.com/en/ (Moutiny's English Homepage)

Mobile phone companies of Iraq